What's Going On may refer to:

Albums
 What's Going On (Marvin Gaye album), 1971
What's Going On (Johnny "Hammond" Smith album), 1971
 What's Going On (Dirty Dozen Brass Band album), 2006
 What's Goin' On (Frank Strozier album), 1977
 What's Goin' On Ai, a 2006 album by Ai
 What's Goin' On, a single album by Omega X

Songs
 "What's Going On" (song), a 1971 song by Marvin Gaye (covered by Cyndi Lauper and others)
 "What's Going On" (Taste song), a 1970 song written by Rory Gallagher
 "What's Going On" (Casey Donovan song), a 2005 single by Casey Donovan
 "What's Going On", a 1960 song by Frankie Ford, B-side to "Chinatown"
 "What's Going On", a song by Canibus from Can-I-Bus
 "What's Going On", a song by Hüsker Dü from Zen Arcade
 "What's Going On?", a 1975 song by Al Stewart from Modern Times
"What’s Going On", a 1984 song by Adam Ant featured in Giorgio Moroder’s restoration of the film Metropolis
 "What's Going On", a song by Todrick Hall from Forbidden
 "What's Goin' On", a 2010 song by Gorilla Zoe
 "What's Really Going On (Strange Fruit)", a song by D'wayne Wiggins
 "Why (What's Goin On?)", a song by The Roots from their 2004 album The Tipping Point

Other uses
 What's Going On (TV series), an American game show
 What's Going On?, a 2008 tour by British comedian Mark Steel
 What's Going On (book), a 1997 book collection by Nathan McCall

See also 
 "What's Up?" (4 Non Blondes song), a 1993 song often erroneously called "What's Going On"

 "What's Goin' On Here", a 1974 song by Deep Purple